Humayun Akhtar Khan is a Pakistani politician, business tycoon, and actuary. He has been elected as a member of the National Assembly four consecutive times between 1990–2007, having served as Federal Minister for Trade and Commerce from 2002–2007 and as Chairman Board of Investment from 1997–1999.

Khan is the Chairman of Akhtar Fuiou Technologies and Institute for Policy Reform, and owns one of the largest conglomerates in Pakistan, comprising Tandlianwala Sugar Mills Group, Zamand Steel, Superior Textile Mill, and Lotte Akhtar Beverages (PepsiCo Franchise).

Early life and education 
Khan received his early education from Army Burn Hall College and Saint Mary's Academy, Rawalpindi. He then received a bachelors degree from Government College University, Lahore, and a masters degree in actuarial science and business administration from University of Manitoba, Canada.

He is a Fellow of the Society of Actuaries, USA since 1980, and the Canadian Institute of Actuaries since 1981.

Business

Lotte Akhtar Beverages
Khan, along with his brothers, decided to move back to Pakistan in 1988 after the death of their father, General Akhtar Abdur Rahman, in a plane crash which also killed President Zia-ul-Haq. The Akhtar brothers, along with their cousin Jahangir Khan Tareen and his brother-in-law Makhdoom Ahmed Mehmood, together bought Riaz Bottlers (bottling and distribution franchise for PepsiCo beverages in Pakistan) from former Chief Minister of Punjab Sadiq Hussain Qureshi. The consortium managed to turn around the fortunes of Riaz Bottlers from bankruptcy to being the standout company in the beverage industry with key sponsorship deals such as that with the Pakistan cricket team and a vast portfolio of beverages including Pepsi, Mountain Dew, 7-Up, Aquafina, Mirinda, Slice, Sting.

In 2018, South Korean chaebol Lotte Chilsung acquired a controlling stake in Riaz Bottlers (now known as Lotte Akhtar Beverages) although the Akhtar brothers maintain a significant minority share and are Lotte's strategic partners in Pakistan.

Tandlianwala Sugar Mills
After success in the beverage industry, the Akhtar brothers entered the Pakistan's sugar industry. They later expanded into production of downstream products such as carbon dioxide and ethanol. Tandlianwala Sugar Mills is the second-largest publicly listed producer of sugar and its allied products on the Pakistan Stock Exchange in terms of revenue, market capitalization, production, and capacity, while it is also the largest exporter of ethanol in the country, comprising 17% of Pakistan's total ethanol exports. As of February 2022, it has a market capitalization of Rs.15.7 billion.

The group includes three sugar mills in Tandlianwala, Muzaffargarh, and Dera Ismail Khan with a combined sugarcane crushing capacity of 48,000 tons of cane per day (480,000 metric tonnes of sugar per year); three ENA ethanol distilleries in Tandlianwala and Muzaffargarh with a production capacity of 380,000 liters of ethanol per day (100,000 metric tonnes of ethanol per year), and a carbon dioxide recovery plant with a capacity of 48 tons per day (annual production of 16,000 tonnes).

Nonprofit Organizations

Institute for Policy Reforms
In March 2014, the Akhtar Brothers founded Institute for Policy Reforms, a nonprofit, nonpartisan think tank. It regularly publishes research reports, analysis, briefs, and fact sheets on key public policy issues concerning Pakistan with a particular focus on economic policy, national security, and international relations. IPR's Board of Advisors includes prominent personalities from various fields of Pakistani society including diplomats, lawyers, legislators, academic scholars, corporate executives, military officers, and bureaucrats.

Political career

Joining IJI and PML-N (1990–1999) 
Humayun Akhtar Khan started his political journey in 1990 when he contested the elections representing Islami Jamhoori Ittehad from NA-92 Lahore constituency (now NA-123 and NA-127), which was then considered a Pakistan Peoples Party stronghold. Khan won the election, beating PPP's Rafiq Ahmed Sheikh.

He became a member of Pakistan Muslim League (N) after it broke from the IJI. In the 1993 general election, he contested for the National Assembly seat from the NA-93 Lahore constituency (now NA-129 and NA-131), which was then known as the 'Larkana of Lahore' as it was another PPP stronghold. He beat PPP's Aitzaz Ahsan, and was thus elected as a Member of the National Assembly for a second time.

Formation of PML-Q (1999–2002)
After the military coup in 1999 in which Nawaz Sharif was overthrown by General Pervez Musharraf, Humayun Akhtar. along with many of Nawaz Sharifs close aides. were under house arrest for months. For two years, the National Accountability Bureau launched thorough investigations against Humayun's family and placed him on the Exit Control List. After being cleared of all allegations leveled against him, Humayun resumed his political career in 2001.

In 2002, General Pervez Musharraf, who by then had also become the President of Pakistan, promised that there would be General Elections in October. Because Nawaz Sharif had been exiled to Saudi Arabia and the military establishment gave the impression that he was gone for good, many of his most prominent party leaders including Chaudhry Shujaat Hussain, Chaudhry Pervaiz Elahi, Ijaz-ul-Haq, Khurshid Mahmud Kasuri, Shaikh Rasheed Ahmad, Mian Azhar and Humayun Akhtar Khan formed a new party called Pakistan Muslim League- Quaid-e-Azam. Humayun contested from constituency NA-125 which was in fact part of what was once called NA-93, the constituency he won from in 1993. This time, his main opponents were Akram Zaki of PML-N and Naveed Chaudhry of PPP.

Prime Ministerial candidacy (2002–2004)
When PML-Q was forming its government in 2002, Humayun Akhtar was one of the candidates considered for the post of Prime Minister. However, President Musharraf and the PML-Q eventually decided to choose the Prime Minister from one of the smaller provinces and hence gave the honor to Zafarullah Khan Jamali of Balochistan.

By early 2004, it was clear that Jamali had fallen out of favor with President Musharraf and his own party members. Jamali did not support Musharraf's decision to keep on his uniform amongst other things while Musharraf was fed up of Jamali's incompetence and poor governance. By May 2004, the party decided to sack Jamali, and in his place, a number of potential candidates were listed. After many high level consultations between the President and his close political and military aides, it was decided that Humayun was the best choice to lead the nation.

Although Humayun had a strong backing of the Pakistan Army and the ISI as many of the top generals had served under his father who led these institutions in the 1980s, his own party leaders the Chaudhrys of Gujrat proved to be the last hurdle in his nomination as they fought tooth and nail to ensure that he did not become the next Prime Minister. Party President Chaudhry Shujaat went to the extent of asking Musharraf to delay the announcement of the new Prime Minister by three weeks till the budget session concluded.

Many political analysts believe that the main reason behind the delay was to postpone Humayun's candidacy as the Chaudhry's felt that he had intentions of hijacking the party from them and as a result threatening Pervaiz Elahi's own political ambitions of eventually becoming Prime Minister after the next election. Eventually, Musharraf adhered to the pressure and the only other viable option for Musharraf was Finance Minister Shaukat Aziz who was a Senator, not a Member of Parliament. Eventually, Chaudhry Shujaat Hussain was made interim Prime Minister for two months and it was decided that Shaukat Aziz would contest an election for the national assembly via by-election. Shortly after contesting and winning the by-election, Shaukat Aziz replaced Chaudhry Shujaat as Prime Minister.

Alliance with PML-N (2012–2013)
In May 2012, the Pakistan Muslim League (Like-minded Group) formed an alliance with the PML-N in a bid to unite all Muslim League factions under the leadership of Nawaz Sharif, with the aim of defeating the PTI and the ruling coalition of PPP and PML-Q in the upcoming general elections. According to the seat adjustment formula that would accommodate several leaders of the Likeminded Group, Humayun was to be awarded a PML-N ticket from NA-124 Lahore instead of NA-125 while his brother Haroon Akhtar was to be awarded a PML-N senate seat in the 2015 senate elections. However, days before the election tickets were finalized, PML-N violated the agreement it signed in 2012 as Humayun did not receive a PML-N ticket from either of the two constituencies, although his brother Haroon was accommodated in June 2015 as a Special Assistant to the Prime Minister on Revenue and was elected as a Senator on a PML-N ticket in the 2018 Senate Election. While Humayun stayed out out of the public eye for the next five years, he spearheaded new joint ventures, mergers and acquisitions for his family businesses.

Pakistan Tehreek-e-Insaf (2018–Present)
In July 2018, Humayun Akhtar joined Pakistan Tehreek-e-Insaf. Having served as a Member of the National Assembly several times from all of the areas comprising NA-131, he led PTI Chairman Imran Khan's campaign in the constituency and played an integral role in helping him defeat Khawaja Saad Rafique by a narrow margin of  680 votes. After Imran Khan decided to keep his MNA seat from Mianwali, Humayun Akhtar was declared PTI's candidate for the by-election from NA-131. In the by-election, he was defeated by Khawaja Saad Rafique, who received 60,476 votes compared to Akhtar's 51,329.

Personal life 
His father, General Akhtar Abdur Rahman, headed the ISI from 1979–1987, eventually going on to become Chairman Joint Chiefs of Staff Committee of the Pakistan Armed Forces, while his brother Senator Haroon Akhtar Khan served as Special Assistant to the Prime Minister on Revenue from 2015 to 2018.

See also
 List of University of Waterloo people

References

External links 

 Official website

1964 births
Living people
Pakistan Peoples Muslim League politicians
Government College University, Lahore alumni
University of Manitoba alumni
Pakistani actuaries
Commerce Ministers of Pakistan
Pakistani industrialists